The 1886 Michigan gubernatorial election was held on November 2, 1886. Republican nominee Cyrus G. Luce defeated Fusion candidate George L. Yaple with 47.65% of the vote.

General election

Candidates
Major party candidates
Cyrus G. Luce, Republican
Other candidates
George L. Yaple, Fusion
Samuel Dickie, Prohibition

Results

References

1886
Michigan
Gubernatorial
November 1886 events